Alessandra Smerilli, F.M.A. (born on 14 November 1974) is an Italian economist, academic, and Catholic religious sister. She has a post-PhD (it. docente) degree in political economy and statistics, obtained from the Pontifical Faculty of Educational Sciences Auxilium.

Early life 
Alessandra Smerilli was born on 14 November 1974 in Vasto, Italy.

Academic career and public and religious service 
In July 1993, Alessandra graduated from the Raffaele Mattioli Scientific High School in her native town, Vasto and later began her studies in economics.

Four years later, in 1997, she has entered the congregation of the Daughters of Mary Help of Christians and at the request of her superior, she continued her studies in economics.

Allesandra continued her studies at the Faculty of Economics of the Roma Tre University and in July 2001, graduated from economics and commerce with specialization in political economy with full marks, honours and the right to publish the thesis.

In June 2006, she obtained a doctorate degree in political economy at the University of Rome "La Sapienza", and on 21 June 2014, received a PhD degree in economics from the School of Economics of the University of East Anglia in Norwich, UK.

Sister Alessandra Smerilli works at the Pontifical Faculty of Educational Sciences Auxilium as an extraordinary professor of political economy and statistics, and also as a member of the University's board of directors. She also teaches economics, ethics and finance at the Faculty of Philosophy of the Salesian Pontifical University and in the master's program in civil and non-profit economics at the University of Milan-Bicocca.

Since 2008, she is a member of the Scientific and Organizational committees of the Social Weeks of Italian Catholics, and since 2013 the Secretary of this initiative. Additionally, she is a member of the Ethics Committees of the CHARIS consortium and also of the Banca Popolare Etica, and a founding member of the School of Civil Economics.

In 2015, she was an auditor at the 15th ordinary general assembly of the Synod of Bishops which took place in Vatican City from 3 to 28 October 2015 on the theme "Young people, faith and vocational discernment".

On 17 April 2019, Pope Francis appointed her as a councilor of the Vatican City State. Soon after that, on 24 May 2019, the same pontiff also appointed her consultant to the general secretariat of the Synod of Bishops.

Since Spring 2020, she has coordinated the Economic Task Force of the Vatican COVID-19 Commission, an institution created by Pope Francis to express the Church's concern in the face of the COVID-19 pandemic and to propose answers to the socio-economic challenges of the future.

Sister Alessandra Smerilli is also a member of the Women for a New Renaissance a task force set up by the Minister for Equal Opportunities and the family of the Italian politician Elena Bonetti.

In May 2020 – with the reception in early 2021 – she was awarded the Order of the Star of Italy for her "academic achievements and commitment to the ethical principles in business and finance".

On 24 March 2021, Pope Francis appointed her the Undersecretary for the Faith and Development Sector of the Dicastery for Promoting Integral Human Development of the Roman Curia. She became, as interim, the first woman secretary of the dicastery on 26 August 2021. This made her the highest ranking woman in the curia at the time. On 23 April 2022 she became the Secretary for the Dicastery.

Publications

Awards 

On 28 May 2020, she was awarded (receiving in early 2021) the Order of the Star of Italy.

References

External links 

 
 Official website 

1974 births
Living people
Alumni of the University of East Anglia
Sisters of Don Bosco
20th-century Roman Catholics
21st-century Roman Catholics
20th-century Italian people
21st-century Italian people